Inčukalns is a village in Sigulda Municipality, Latvia. Inčukalns had 2,028 residents in 2006 .

Towns and villages in Latvia
Sigulda Municipality
Vidzeme